Charles Luers Nordsiek (April 19, 1896 – March 9, 1937) was a seaman in the United States Navy and a Medal of Honor recipient for his role in the United States occupation of Veracruz.

He received the Medal of Honor at the age of 18 making him one of the youngest recipients of the medal in its history.   Shortly after the United States' entry into World War I, he was promoted to the rank of lieutenant in the Naval Auxiliary Reserve on May 29, 1917.

He died March 9, 1937, and is buried next to his wife Mary (1898–1966) at Arlington National Cemetery, Arlington, Virginia.

Medal of Honor citation
Rank and organization: Ordinary Seaman, U.S. Navy. Born: 19 April 1896, New York, N.Y. Accredited to: New York. G.O. No.: 101, 15 June 1914.

Citation:

On board the U.S.S. Florida, Nordsiek showed extraordinary heroism in the line of his profession during the seizure of Vera Cruz, Mexico, 21 and 22 April 1914.

See also

 List of Medal of Honor recipients (Veracruz)

References

External links
 

1896 births
1937 deaths
United States Navy Medal of Honor recipients
United States Navy sailors
Military personnel from New York City
Burials at Arlington National Cemetery
United States Navy personnel of World War I
Battle of Veracruz (1914) recipients of the Medal of Honor
American expatriates in Mexico